The Devil Probably is a 1977 French drama film by director Robert Bresson. It was entered into the 27th Berlin International Film Festival, where it won the Silver Bear - Special Jury Prize.

German film director Rainer Werner Fassbinder was on that particular jury, and championed Bresson's film:

Robert Bresson's Le Diable probablement  ... is the most shattering film I've seen this Berlin Festival. I think it's a major film [...]. [I]n the future—and this world will probably last for another few thousand years—this film will be more important than all the rubbish which is now considered important but which never really goes deep enough[.] The questions Bresson asks will never be unimportant."

The critic J. Hoberman described the movie with one sentence: "A Dostoyevskian story of a tormented soul, presented in the stylized manner of a medieval illumination."

Cast
 Antoine Monnier - Charles
 Tina Irissari - Alberte
 Henri de Maublanc - Michel
 Laetitia Carcano - Edwige
 Nicolas Deguy - Valentin
 Régis Hanrion - Dr. Mime, psychoanalyst
 Geoffroy Gaussen - Libraire
 Roger Honorat - Commissaire

References

External links
 
 

1977 films
1970s French-language films
1977 drama films
Films directed by Robert Bresson
Films scored by Philippe Sarde
Silver Bear Grand Jury Prize winners
French drama films
1970s French films